The Macalester Plymouth United Church Hymn Contest is a highly regarded annual search for new hymns instituted by a leading Minnesota congregation which is a union of the United Church of Christ (UCC) and the Presbyterian Church (USA).

History
Since 1996, Macalester Plymouth United Church of St. Paul, Minnesota, has sponsored a hymn-writing contest seeking new hymn texts that "can motivate the church to be more actively involved in social reform."  The St. Paul contest is funded with an endowment by A.A. "Al" Heckman, a church member who was widely known as Minnesota’s “Dean of Philanthropy” who died in 1994.

The longest-running English language hymn contest attracts entries from the United States and the rest of the English-speaking world, including Great Britain, Canada, and Australia.  In church hymn circles, the hymn contest has acquired a level of importance capable of elevating a previously unknown artist to international prominence and providing deserved recognition of established hymn writers.

Annual Themes and Winning Hymns
Chronological list includes co-winning hymns and honorable mention hymns.

1996 Theme: Hymns that call the church to work for social justice
 1996 Winning hymn Who Will Speak a Word of Warning - Richard Leach, Torrington, CT

1997 Theme: Hymns that call the church to nurture and care for children everywhere
 1997 Winning hymn Gentle Jesus, Loving Shepherd - Lurline DuPre, Denton, TX
 1997 Honorable mention The Children We Hold Dear - David A. Robb, Dalton, GA
 1997 Honorable mention The People Came from Everywhere - Mary Nelson Keithahn, Belle Fourche, SD

1998 Theme: Hymns that speak to the role and ministry of the church in addressing social concerns faced by our communities, our nation and our world as we enter a new century
 1998 Winning hymn How Long Ago the World Was Taught - Richard Leach, Torrington, CT
 1998 Honorable mention Companion of the Poor - Dan Damon, Point Richmond, CA
 1998 Honorable mention God Has Asked “Whom Shall I Send Forth?” - Michael Morgan, Atlanta, GA
 1998 Honorable mention O Hear My Voice, My People - Robert Gardiner, Southampton, MA

1999 Theme: Hymns which address environmental stewardship at a time of conflicting national / tribal interests
 1999 Winning hymn The Garden Needs Our Tending Now - Mary Louise Bringle, Laurinberg, NC

2000 Theme: Hymns based on the Hebrew prophets’ calls for justice
 2000 Winning hymn As the Bear That Roams the Timber - John Core, Morgantown, WV

2001 Theme: Hymns which call the church to greater inclusivity
 2001 Winning hymn O God, By Whose Guidance - Robert Gardiner, Southampton, MA

2002 Theme: Hymns which call the church to affirm gay, lesbian, bisexual and transgender persons and to celebrate their gifts and ministries
 2002 Co-winning hymn Faces and Facets - Alan J. Hommerding, Chicago, IL
 2002 Co-winning hymn In the Desert Where They’d Wandered - Richard Spalding, Williamstown, MA
 2002 Co-winning hymn The Love That Goes Unspoken - Mary Louise Bringle, Etowah, NC

2003 Theme: Hymns which call the church and its people to work for peace
 2003 Winning hymn O God of Peace, Who Gave Us Breath and Birth - Timothy Dudley-Smith, Salisbury, UK
 2003 Honorable mention God Is Still Speaking - Barbara Hamm, Martinez, CA

2004 Theme: Hymns which celebrate religious diversity and encourage interfaith cooperation, with the understanding that many of the world’s social problems are rooted in religious intolerance
 2004 Winning hymn Creator of the Intertwined - Jacque B. Jones, Brooklyn, NY

2005 Theme: Hymns which call the church and its people to greater awareness of the plight of the homeless, and to the need for affordable housing for all people
 2005 Winning hymn The Church of Christ Cannot be Bound - Adam M. L. Tice, Goshen, IN
 2005 Honorable mention If God Is Anywhere At All - Pamela Payne, Huntsville, AL
 2005 Honorable mention A Home for All Is God’s Desire - William Allen Pasch, Griffin, GA

2006 Theme: Hymns that call the church and its people to practice the forgiveness of enemies and to commend to the nations as practical politics the search for cooperation and peace.
 2006 Co-winning hymn Disarming Presence, Win Us - Dorothy Fulton, Abington, Pennsylvania
 2006 Co-winning hymn To Dream of It Is Wondrous - John Core, Morgantown, West Virginia

2007: Theme: New hymns to use on Mother's Day, sensitive to the changing nature of family life, and affirming feminist calls for equality.
 2007 Winning hymn: Thank You, God, For Mother - Nathan Crabtree, Hickory, NC
 2007 Honorable mention O Loving Creator, We Labor with You - Jann Aldredge-Clanton, Dallas, TX

2008: Theme: Hymns which will enable the church and its people to lament, to cry out in anger and frustration to God.
 2008 Co-winning hymn When Brutal Forces Crush Out Love - R. Frederick Crider, Jr., Timonium, MD
 2008 Co-winning hymn Earth Is Aching - David Gambrell, Louisville, KY
 2008 Co-winning hymn Can We Curse Without Blaspheming? - William Allen Pasch, Griffin, GA

2009: Theme: Hymns to be sung on Labor Day, with words that especially address the plight of the unemployed.
 2009 Winning hymn God Bless the Work Your People Do - John A. Dalles, Longwood, FL
 2009 Honorable mention When Work of Heart and Hand Align - Pamela Payne, Huntsville, AL

References

Hymnology
Competitions
Recurring events established in 1996